William Henry John Seffern (1829–1900) was a New Zealand printer, newspaper editor, journalist and historian. Born in County Cork, Ireland in 1829, he emigrated to Australia before moving to Auckland, New Zealand in the 1850s. As of the mid-1860s, Seffern he was the manager and later proprietor of the Auckland newspaper, the New-Zealander. In 1868 he became the manager and editor of the Taranaki Herald. He wrote a number of works on the history of Taranaki in the 1880s and 1890s. He retired from the Taranaki Herald in 1895, and died in New Plymouth in October 1900.

References

1829 births
1900 deaths
19th-century New Zealand historians
New Zealand journalists
People from County Cork
Irish emigrants to New Zealand (before 1923)
New Zealand editors
New Zealand magazine editors
19th-century journalists
Male journalists
19th-century male writers